Jenny Palmqvist (born 2 November 1969) is a Swedish association football  referee.

Early life and education
Palmqvist was born in South Korea and grew up in Sweden.

Career
Palmqvist has refereed several major women's association football matches at domestic and international level. These include the final of the 2004 Summer Olympics tournament and the 2009 and 2012 UEFA Champions Leagues. In the 2012 Summer Olympics' United States 1–0 North Korea group stage game she showed North Korea's Choe Mi-gyong the only red card in the tournament. She previously signaled the tournament's first penalty in the opening matchday's Brazil 5–0 Cameroon.

Major games by tournament

National teams
 2004 Summer Olympics — The United States 2–1 Brazil final.
 2006 Asian Cup — The Australia 2–0 Japan semifinal.
 2006 U–20 World Championship — The China 0–0 United States third place game and the United States 4–1 Germany quarterfinals.
 2007 World Cup — The United States 3–0 England quarterfinals.
 2008 Summer Olympics — The United States 2–1 Canada quarterfinals.
 2009 European Championship — The Germany 2–1 Italy quarterfinals. 
 2011 World Cup — The France 1–1 England quarterfinals, won by France on penalties.
 2012 Summer Olympics — The Canada 1–0 France bronze medal match.

Clubs
 2004 UEFA Women's Cup — The Fulham 1–4 (2–7) Frankfurt quarterfinal's 2nd leg.
 2007 UEFA Women's Cup — The Arsenal 4–1 (9–1) Breiðablik quarterfinal's 2nd leg.
 2008 UEFA Women's Cup — The Arsenal 2–3 (2–3) Olympique Lyon quarterfinal's 2nd leg.
 2009 UEFA Women's Cup — The Duisburg 1–1 (7–1) Zvezda Perm final's 2nd leg.
 2010 UEFA Champions League — The Duisburg 2–1 (4–1) Arsenal quarterfinal's 1st leg.
 2011 UEFA Champions League — The Duisburg 2–1 (5–2) Everton quarterfinal's 2nd leg.
 2012 UEFA Champions League — The Olympique Lyon 2–0 Frankfurt final.

References

1969 births
Living people
Swedish football referees
Swedish people of South Korean descent
FIFA Women's World Cup referees
Olympic football referees
Football referees at the 2012 Summer Olympics
Women association football referees